UDP-4-amino-4,6-dideoxy-N-acetyl-beta-L-altrosamine transaminase (PseC) is an enzyme with systematic name UDP-4-amino-4,6-dideoxy-N-acetyl-beta-L-altrosamine:2-oxoglutarate aminotransferase. This enzyme catalyses the following chemical reaction

 UDP-4-amino-4,6-dideoxy-N-acetyl-beta-L-altrosamine + 2-oxoglutarate  UDP-2-acetamido-2,6-dideoxy-beta-L-arabino-hex-4-ulose + L-glutamate

This enzyme is a pyridoxal-phosphate protein.

References

External links 
 

EC 2.6.1